The  Florida Network of Youth and Family Services  is a non-profit statewide association and contract management entity, of 31 agencies dealing with runaway, truant, ungovernable and other troubled youth and their families.

History 

The Florida Network of Youth and Family Services ("The Florida Network") was founded in 1976. It has a special statutory designation to provide its youth crisis centers services specifically as a "Children/Families In Need of Services" (CINS/FINS) organization.

Originally, there were seventeen Florida Network crisis shelters providing services in specialized client intake, crisis stabilization, residential and non-residential counseling, and case management.

Eventually, the Florida Network of Youth and Family Services would expand to 31 crisis agencies and community-based organizations, while adding onto its plate contract monitoring (in 2001, the Florida Department of Juvenile Justice would give it exclusive contract management responsibility for CINS/FINS), data collection, quality improvement, staff training, communications and fundraising.

Moreover, it would receive recognition from the American Bar Association and the Vera Institute of Justice for its path-breaking program model, while also being profiled by  The New York Times   for its early efforts to help at-risk teenagers.

Today, the Florida Network of Youth and Family Services is a model Florida Department of Juvenile Justice service provider, carefully managing a $31 million contract, and running a full-scale membership portfolio that includes a refined quality improvement process, legislative advocacy, comprehensive best practices training in prevention, and non-profit financial management expertise, making it one of the most effective organizations for prevention advocacy within the United States.

Leadership 

The Florida Network of Youth and Family Services is a membership-based association of 31 agencies, run by a 16-member citizen Board of Directors', and the President/CEO of the organization, Stacy Gromatski. Board membership is based on circuit representation, and includes three agency directors as ex-officio members of the Board of Directors.'

Board of Directors

Chairman Chris Dudley, Southern Strategy Group

Vice Chairman Sheriff Don Eslinger, Seminole County

Treasurer David Griffin, Consultant

Secretary Cynthia Hadley, Community Leader

Dominic Calabro, Immediate Past Chairman, Florida TaxWatch

Barry Cofield, NFL Player

Laurie Jackson, National Safe Place

Samuel Morley, General Counsel, Florida Press Association

Tracy Salem, Ex Officio, Orange County Government

Carl Weinrich, Ex Officio, President/CEO, Sarasota YMCA

Brian C. Johnson, Ex Officio, Community Based-Connections

Jim Pearce, Ex Officio, CDS Family & Behavioral Services

Matt Meadows, Former Legislator

Kathy Tuell, Former President/CEO of the Florida Keys Children's Shelter

Dennis Jones, Former Tallahassee Police Chief

Maggie Bowles, Community Advocate and Volunteer

Staff

Stacy Gromatski, Ed.S, President/CEO

Terry DeCerchio, M.A., Director of CINS/FINS Contract Operations

Keith Dean, C.P.A., Chief Financial Officer

Keith Carr, Contract Compliance Monitor

Kirk Hudson, B.S., Statistician and Director of Information Management

John Robertson, M.S., Program Services Director

Celia Bass, Office Administrator/Event Planner

Jessica Fransler, CINS/FINS Contract Specialist

Megan Smith, M.S., Statewide Respite Coordinator

Michelle Avaroma, M.P.A., Communications Coordinator

Karen Boulding, Statewide Training Coordinator

Highlights 

 In 1974, the United States Congress enacted the Runaway and Homeless Youth Act (Title III), establishing 60 programs to serve runaway youths nationwide.
 In 1976, the Florida Network of Youth and Family Services was incorporated with an office in Tampa.
 In 1981, the Florida Legislature provided state funds for runaway services for the first time.
 In 1982, the Florida Network of Youth and Family Services opened its Tallahassee office.
 In 1984, the Florida Runaway Youth and Family Act was passed.
 In 1994, the Florida Department of Juvenile Justice would begin to take over funding and overnight from the defunct Florida Department of Health and Rehabilitative Services.
 In 2001, the Florida Department of Juvenile Justice would enter into a single, statewide contract with the Florida Network to for provide CINS/FINS services.
 In 2007, the Florida Network of Youth and Family Services celebrates 30 years of leadership.
 In 2008, the Florida Network of Youth and Family Services is nationally recognized by the American Bar Association and the Vera Institute of Justice as an exemplar program.
 In 2009, the Florida Network of Youth and Family Services was recognized by the U.S. Department of Justice's Office of Juvenile Justice Delinquency and Prevention as a 'best practice' agency in the de-institutionalization of status offenders
 In 2010, the Associated Press profiled the Florida Network of Youth and Family Services in an article titled "Intercepting youths on the path to trouble."
 In 2011, the Justice Research Center, an independent research firm, estimated the Florida Network's services contribution to cost savings to the State of Florida to be $160 million.

References 

Florida Network profile., The New York Times  on 4 December 2008.

OJJDP. , U.S. Department of Justice, Office of Juvenile Justice Delinquency and Prevention.

Florida TaxWatch Accountability Report. , Florida Watch Watch Accountability Report, September 2001.

JRC Cost Study. , Justice Research Center, February 2011.

Florida Statute.

External links 
Florida Network of Youth and Family Services
Anchorage Children's Home 
Arnette House
Boys Town of Central Florida 
Capital City Youth Services
Children's Home Society
Community-Based Connections
Crosswinds Youth Shelter
CDS Family and Behavioral Health Centers
Family Resources
Florida Keys Children's Shelter
Hillsborough County  
Orange County Youth and Family Services
Lutheran Services Florida
Sarasota Family YMCA
Tampa Housing Authority
Urban League of Palm Beach County
Youth Advocate Program
Youth Crisis Center, Inc.
Youth and Family Alternatives, Inc.
Wayman Community Development Corp.

Youth organizations based in Florida
Child welfare in the United States
State agencies of Florida